Katy Dunne was the defending champion but chose not to participate.

Maryna Zanevska won the title, defeating Ylena In-Albon in the final, 7–6(7–5), 6–4.

Seeds

Draw

Finals

Top half

Bottom half

References

Main Draw

Torneig Internacional Els Gorchs - Singles